Californication is a television series created for Showtime by Tom Kapinos and starring David Duchovny as Hank Moody, a famous writer trying to juggle his career, his relationship with his daughter and his ex-girlfriend, as well as his appetite for sex.

Series overview

Episodes

Season 1 (2007)
The first season of Californication premiered August 13, 2007 and ended October 29, 2007. The season follows Hank Moody and the other main characters in the months leading up to the marriage of Hank's ex-girlfriend Karen and Bill, a Los Angeles publisher. Hank is wallowing deep in self-loathing following the release of A Crazy Little Thing Called Love, which he perceives as a sub-par yet popular movie adaptation to his most recent novel, God Hates Us All.

After picking up a younger woman in a bookstore, Hank finds out that she is actually Bill's 16-year-old daughter, Mia. Hank spends most of his time drinking and not writing. Meanwhile, Mia continues to haunt Hank during his visits to his family, using the threat of exposing his statutory rape of her to steal stories for her creative writing class. The death of his father triggers an alcohol fuelled binge and an eventual sexual encounter with Karen.

After his father's funeral, Hank stays in New York to finish a manuscript for a new novella. When Hank returns to LA, the original copy is lost when he is carjacked. Mia has retained her own copy, and tries to pass the work off as her own. At her father's wedding she has to deny that the book is about her having sex with Hank. On Karen and Bill's wedding day, Hank chooses to accept Karen's choice, but as he leaves the reception with Becca, Karen runs out and jumps into the car, riding off into a new life together.

Season 2 (2008)
Californication's second season premiered September 28, 2008 and ended December 14, 2008. The newly reunited couple of Hank and Karen seem to be working, their house is on the market, and Becca seems happy again. Hank gets a vasectomy and attends a party thrown by Sonja, whom he'd been with in the first season. A mistake and a fight with an obnoxious police officer lands Hank in jail, where he meets world-famous record producer Lew Ashby, who commissions Hank to write his biography.

After too much office masturbation costs him his job, Charlie decides to go into the porn industry. He becomes the agent/paternal-figure of porn star Daisy and finances her movie, "Vaginatown". Marcy goes into rehab for her cocaine addiction and Charlie starts an affair with Daisy. Hank proposes to Karen on the night that they discover that Hank could be the father of Sonja's child. When Karen says no, Hank decides that they can no longer be together.

Hank moves in with Ashby, who starts a romance with Mia. Becca finds a boyfriend named Damien. Mia's book becomes a hit and Ashby holds a party in its honor, where Damien cheats on Becca and Charlie decides to divorce Marcy to get together with Daisy. After the party Hank goes looking for Lew when his "one-that-got-away" girlfriend arrives, but Ashby dies of an overdose of heroin he had mistaken for cocaine.

Hank finishes Ashby's biography. Charlie ends up working at a BMW dealership in the San Fernando Valley. When Sonja's baby is born, Hank is cleared of being the father because the child is half-black. As Hank and Karen turn toward each other again, Karen is offered a job in New York. Hank looks forward to going back there with her, but when Damien and Becca reconcile, Hank decides it would be wrong to remove Becca from Los Angeles, so he and Becca will stay in L.A. while Karen moves to New York. The season closes with Karen's plane leaving for New York and Hank and Becca walking on the Venice boardwalk.

Season 3 (2009)
The third season of Californication premiered September 27, 2009 and ended December 13, 2009.

Season 4 (2011)

Season 5 (2012)

Season 6 (2013)

Season 7 (2014)

References

External links
 
 

 
Californication

it:Episodi di Californication (prima stagione)